Holbrook is a small town on the traditional lands of the Wiradjuri people in Southern New South Wales, Australia. The town is in the Greater Hume Shire which was established in May 2004 from the merger of Culcairn Shire with the majority of Holbrook Shire and part of the Hume Shire. At the 2016 census, Holbrook had a population of 1,715 people. The district around Holbrook is renowned for local produce including merino wool, wheat and other grains, lucerne, fat cattle and lamb.

History
Holbrook is on the traditional lands of the Wiradjuri people.

The explorers Hume and Hovell were the first-known Europeans in the area. They travelled through in 1824 looking for new grazing country in the south of the colony of New South Wales.

The town was originally called Ten Mile Creek and the first buildings were erected in 1836. A German immigrant, John Christopher Pabst, became the publican of the Woolpack Hotel on 29 July 1840 and the area became known as "the Germans". By 1858 the name had evolved into the official name of Germanton, though the postal area retained the name Ten Mile Creek. In 1876 the name Germanton was gazetted and the old name Ten Mile Creek consigned to history.

Ten Mile Creek Post Office opened on 1 January 1857, and was renamed Germanton in 1875.

On 17 August 1878, Germanton hosted the earliest known game of Soccer (Association Football) in New South Wales between Germanton and Yarra Yarra football teams.

During World War I, the town name was deemed unpatriotic so on 24 August 1915 the town was renamed Holbrook in honour of Lt. Norman Douglas Holbrook, a decorated wartime submarine captain and winner of the Victoria Cross. Lt. Holbrook commanded the submarine .

The town was a stop on Old Sydney Road – the road between Sydney and Melbourne. The railway arrived in Germanton in 1902. The town was serviced by the Holbrook branch railway line until the line was closed in 1975.

In 2013, a re-alignment of the Hume Highway around Holbrook was completed so it is now possible to by-pass the town.

Garryowen
A larger settlement was planned but never built.

Local landmarks

HMAS Otway

The Navy gifted the fin from the submarine to the town. This resulted in a fund-raiser by the town and district to purchase the whole submarine. This drive was successful in raising $100,000, almost all a gift from Lt Holbrook's widow, Gundula Holbrook. However, this amount was insufficient to purchase all of the Otway. Through negotiations with the scrap yard in Sydney, the town succeeded in purchasing all of the outside casing of Otway above the waterline. This part of the Otway is now displayed in Germanton Park in the heart of Holbrook, having been dedicated on 7–8 June 1997.

National Museum of Australian Pottery
The National Museum of Australian Pottery is housed in the old A. H. Mackie and Company building. It features over 1500 pieces made from the earliest colonial potteries up to the end of World War 1.

Demographics
The population of the town was 1,267 people at the 2001 census. The population of the former Holbrook Shire was 2343 people. The population had declined by 7.4% (186 people) from 1996 and by 10.3% (269 people) since 1991.  In 2001 the population of Australia increased by 6% from the 1996 census and 12.6% since the 1991 census.

Less than 1% of the population identified themselves as being of indigenous origin (compared with 2.2% for the whole of Australia).

The median age of people in Holbrook in the 2001 Census was 40 years. In the 1996 Census the median age of people was 37 years, while in the 1991 Census the median age of people was 34 years.  The median age for the whole of Australia in 2001 was 35 years.

This compares with 93% in the 1996 Census and 92% in the 1991 Census. In the 2001 Census, the three most common ancestries identified with were: Australian: 1184 people (50.7%); English: 810 people (34.7%) and; Irish: 247 people (10.6%). In 2001 73% of all Australians were Australian born. Across Australia the three most common ancestries identified with were similar to Holbrook but with a reduced percentage identifying Australian ancestry: Australian: 36%; English: 34% and; Irish: 10%.

English was the only language spoken at home by 95.3% of those in the Holbrook local statistical area compared with 80% of Australians.

In the week preceding the 2001 Census, 807 people (34.5%) had used a personal computer at home. The total number of persons who had used the Internet in the week preceding the 2001 Census was 541 (23%).  42% of Australians had used a personal computer at home in the preceding week and 37% of Australians had used the internet.

In the 2001 Census, there were 1078 married people (60%), 53 separated people (3%), 98 divorced people (6%), 165 widowed people (9%) and 397 people who had never been married (22%).  51% of Australians were married at the time of the census.

In the 2001 Census, 22 (1.2%) people held a postgraduate degree, graduate diploma or graduate certificate. This compares with 3% of the Australian population. 106 (6%) people held a bachelor's degree, compared with 10% of the Australian population.  There were 385 (21%) people with an advanced diploma, diploma or certificate in the 2001 Census, compared with 22% of the Australian population.  1289 (72%) people did not have a qualification, did not state a qualification or stated a qualification outside of the scope of the standard classification; this compares with 65% of the Australian population.

During the week prior to Census Night 2001, 1021 people in Holbrook statistical local area were employed, representing 96% of the labour force. Of these, 658 (64.4%) people (485 males and 173 females) were working full-time and 321 (31.4%) people (93 males and 228 females) were working part-time. This compares with 92% of people who were employed in the 1996 Census and 90% of people who were employed in the 1991 Census.  93% of the Australian labour force were employed on census night.

In the 2001 Census, 39 people were unemployed, representing 3.7% of the labour force. In the 1996 Census, there were 93 (8.4%) unemployed people and 115 (9.7%) unemployed people in the 1991 Census.  7.4% of the Australian labour force were unemployed on census night.

In the 2001 Census, 274 (26.8%) people were employed as Managers and Administrators.  There were 102 (10.0%) people employed as Associate Professionals and there were 101 (9.9%) people employed as Intermediate Clerical, Sales and Service Workers.  Across Australia 9% of people were employed as Managers and Administrators; 12% as Associate Professionals and 17% as Intermediate Clerical, Sales and Service Workers.

In the 2001 Census, 95 (9.2%) people were employed in the Manufacturing industry, which compares with 3.6% of people in the 1996 Census and 5.6% of people in the 1991 Census. There were 126 (12.2%) people employed in the Retail Trade industry and there were 30 (2.9%) people (0 males and 30 females) employed in the Education industry.  Across Australia 12% were employed in the Manufacturing industry, 15% in the Retail Trade industry and 7% in the Education industry. A softwood timber mill opened in 1998 which has subsequently closed.

The median weekly individual income for people aged 15 years and over in the 2001 Census was $300–$399.  This was the same as for Australia.

In the 2001 Census, there were 291 couple families with children (which comprised 44.7% of all families in occupied private dwellings), 283 couple families without children (43.5%), 70 one parent families (10.8%) and 7 other families (1.1%). There were 42 people (1.9%) in group households and 238 people (10.7%) in lone person households in the 2001 Census.  Across Australia 47% of all families in occupied private dwellings were couple families with children, 36% couple families without children, 16% one parent families and 2% other families. There were 3% of people in group households and 9% in lone person households.

In the 2001 Census, there were 865 separate houses (92.7%), 37 flats, units or apartments (4.0%) and 31 other dwellings (3.3%).  Of all occupied private dwellings in the 2001 Census, 670 were either fully owned or being purchased, which represents (71.6%) of all occupied private dwellings, while 177 (18.9%) were being rented. 75% of Australian dwellings are separate houses and 66% of all Australian dwellings were either fully owned or being purchased.

See also
 Australian place names changed from German names

References

External links
Detail on the relationship between Norman Douglas Holbrook VC and the town of Holbrook
Greater Hume Shire Council
Things to see and do in Holbrook
Holbrook Railway Station
Musings on Holbrook (or Germanton) – Internet Family History Association of Australia page

Towns in the Riverina
Towns in New South Wales
Hume Highway
Greater Hume Shire